Jordan and Morocco share a close relationship as both Jordan and Morocco are Arab countries despite the fact that Jordan is an Asian country and Morocco is an African country. Both Jordan and Morocco share common royal relationship, Jordan is led by the Hashemites and Morocco is led by the Alaouites; and are perceived among the most liberal Kingdoms in the MENA. Jordan has an embassy in Rabat and Morocco has an embassy in Amman.

History and modern relations
Modern relationship between Jordan and Morocco was established in 20th century, when Jordan and Morocco gained independence from Britain and France. For most of 20th century, both Jordan and Morocco had together faced turbulent turmoils within each nations, notably pan-Arabist movements, attempts from assassinate to overthrow the Governments in both countries and their secret ties with Israel. In spite of these hardships, however, King Hussein of Jordan and Hassan II of Morocco also overcame these turmoils at home. Two Kings were known for sharing a close and strong personal relationship, boosting alliance between two Royal families. Two Kings also died on the same year at 1999, and received mourners from global communities and homelands. Their sons, Abdullah II of Jordan and Mohammed VI of Morocco are also widely acclaimed celebrities in both countries.

In 2017, Abdullah II paid a visit to Morocco, received warm welcome from Mohammed VI. On 27 March 2019, Mohammed VI received King Abdullah II for a working visit in Casablanca.

Cooperations
Both countries, deemed to share close bond, share a very close cooperation ranged from political, economic to security ties. Two countries are also invited to join the Gulf Cooperation Council headed by Saudi Arabia, a fellow monarchy. The two nations also have a cautious relationship with Iran, which Jordan even voiced support to Morocco when Rabat cut tie with Tehran following accusations of Iran's support to Polisario in Western Sahara.

During the Qatar crisis, Jordan and Morocco try to refrain from siding with anyone, both want to consolidate their role as neutral players and even voiced to solve it diplomatically, which didn't satisfy Mohammed Bin Salman, the energetic Crown Prince of Saudi Arabia.

Diplomatic missions

Jordan Embassy 
The Jordan embassy is located in Rabat. Jordan has a consulate in Laayoune.

 Ambassador Jumana Ghunaimat

Moroccan Embassy 
The Moroccan embassy is located in Amman.

 Ambassador Naciri Sidi Mohamed Khalid

See also
Hashemites
Alaouite dynasty

References

 
Morocco
Jordan